Saint-Juéry XIII, nicknamed the Scorpions, are a French Rugby league club based in Saint-Juéry, Tarn in the Midi-Pyrénées region. The club plays in the Midi-Pyrénées League in the French National Division 2.

Club honours
Fédéral Championship
Winners – 1980

Club details
President: Jacky Fuss
Club Address:
Tel: 05 63 78 82 20
Email:

See also
National Division 2

External links
 Club Website

French rugby league teams